Love Will Be Reborn is the fifth studio album by Martha Wainwright, released on August 20, 2021, by Pheromone Records and Cooking Vinyl. It was produced by Pierre Marchand.

Promotion
The title track serves as the lead single. Wainwright is scheduled to tour throughout the United Kingdom in September 2021.

Track listing

Deluxe bonus tracks

Charts

References

2021 albums
Albums produced by Pierre Marchand
Cooking Vinyl albums
Martha Wainwright albums